10,000 is the natural number following 9,999 and preceding 10,001.

10000 may also refer to:

 10,000, the last year in the 10th millennium and 100th century, a century leap year starting on Saturday
 Myriad
 Ten Thousand, a group of Greek mercenary units
 LNER Class W1, a famous experimental steam locomotive in the United Kingdom
 British Rail Class D16/1, named LMS No. 10000 and 10001 were the first mainline diesel locomotives built in Great Britain
 10,000 Dawns, a science fiction series published by Arcbeatle Press

See also
 10.000 (disambiguation)
 Orders of magnitude (numbers)
 Ten thousand years
 myria-